Helicops trivittatus, the equatorial keelback, is a species of snake in the family Colubridae. It is found in Brazil.

References 

Helicops
Snakes of South America
Reptiles of Brazil
Endemic fauna of Brazil
Reptiles described in 1849
Taxa named by John Edward Gray